Panax trifolius, commonly called dwarf ginseng, is plant native to the Northeastern and Appalachian regions of North America. It is found in low mesic woods with acidic soils.

It produces an umbel of white flowers in late spring. This species was used for traditional medicine by Native Americans. Its tubers can be eaten raw or boiled.

References

trifolius